Keewaywin Airport  is located  southwest of the First Nations community of Keewaywin, Ontario, Canada.

References

Certified airports in Kenora District